is a former Japanese football player. He played for Japan national team.

Club career
Yamano was born in Osaka Prefecture on April 5, 1955. After graduating from Osaka University of Commerce, he joined his local club Yanmar Diesel in 1978. The club won the league champions in 1980. The club also won 1983 and 1984 JSL Cup. In 1985, he moved to Osaka Gas. He retired in 1991.

National team career
On June 11, 1980, Yamano debuted for Japan national team against China. He played 2 games for Japan in 1980.

Club statistics

National team statistics

References

External links
 
 Japan National Football Team Database

1955 births
Living people
Osaka University of Commerce alumni
Association football people from Osaka Prefecture
Japanese footballers
Japan international footballers
Japan Soccer League players
Cerezo Osaka players
Osaka Gas SC players
Association football defenders